Abstract comics are comics that combine concepts of visual abstraction with the traditional continuity of the comic strip.

A collection of abstract comics was brought together in the book Abstract Comics: The Anthology edited by Andrei Molotiu. The Danish publisher Fahrenheit published Nautilus by Molotiu and Reykjavik by Henrik Rehr, both abstract graphic novels, in 2009. Creators of abstract comics included in Molotiu's anthology include Robert Crumb, Andrei Molotiu, Patrick McDonnell, Mark Badger, Henrik Rehr, Benoit Joly, Ibn Al Rabin (nom de plume of Mathieu Bailif), Mark Staff Brandl, and Gary Panter.

See also
 Abstract art
 Alternative comics

References
 Andrei Molotiu (ed.), Abstract Comics: The Anthology (Seattle: Fantagraphics, 2009).
 Jan Baetens, "Abstraction in Comics", SubStance, vol. 40, no. 1, 2011, pp. 94–113.
 Roxana Marcoci, Comic Abstraction: Image-Breaking, Image-Making (New York: MoMA, 2007). 
 Aarnoud Rommens et al. (dir.), Abstraction and Comics/Bande dessinée et abstraction (Brussels: La Cinquième Couche/Presses universitaires de Liège, 2019).

External links
Abstraction in Comics by Jan Baetens 
Molotiu on Fantagraphics' Abstract Comics at Comic Book Resources
Robot reviews: Abstract Comics by Chris Mautner
Abstract Comics by Sara Cole at PopMatters
Abstract Comics review by Sean Rogers at The Walrus
A Quick Introduction To Abstract Comics by Tim Gaze at Action Yes
Abstract comics review by Ryan Holmberg at Hooded Utilitarian
Abstract comics review by Tim Platt

Comics genres